The 1997 World Series was the championship series of Major League Baseball's (MLB) 1997 season.  The 93rd edition of the World Series, it was a best-of-seven playoff between the American League (AL) champion Cleveland Indians and the National League (NL) champion Florida Marlins. The Marlins, who were underdogs,  defeated the Indians, four games to three, to win their first World Series championship. Game 7 was decided in extra innings on a walk-off single hit by Édgar Rentería. The series began on October 18 and ended on October 26 (though Game 7 ended just after midnight local time October 27). Marlins pitcher Liván Hernández was named the World Series Most Valuable Player.

The Indians advanced to the World Series by defeating the New York Yankees in the AL Division Series, three games to two, and then the Baltimore Orioles in the AL Championship Series, four games to two; it was Cleveland's second World Series appearance in three years. The Marlins advanced to the World Series by defeating the San Francisco Giants in the NL Division Series, three games to none, and then the Atlanta Braves in the NL Championship Series, four games to two; the Marlins set an MLB record by reaching a World Series in just their fifth season of existence. This was the fourth time in World Series history a Game 7 went into extra innings, and was the most recent occasion until the 2016 World Series, in which the Indians also lost in extra innings. The Marlins' championship made them the first wild card team to ever win the World Series.

This was the only World Series that Paul Beeston would preside over as CEO of MLB. The previous four World Series had been presided over jointly by the league presidents (first Dr. Bobby Brown and then Gene Budig for the AL, Leonard Coleman for the NL).

Summary

Matchups

Game 1

The first World Series game in the state of Florida, Game 1 featured a youngster and a veteran facing each other on the mound. Fresh off his NLCS MVP performance, Liván Hernández took the hill for the Marlins and quickly gave up a run in the first thanks to a double by leadoff man Bip Roberts and an RBI single by David Justice. Indian starter Orel Hershiser got by the first two innings unscathed. However, after the Marlins tied the game in the third on Edgar Renteria's RBI groundout with two on, they scored four runs in the fourth. Moisés Alou's three-run home run off the left field foul pole put the Marlins up 4–1 and Charles Johnson followed with a home run to make it 5–1. After Manny Ramírez's home run in the fifth cut the lead to 5–2, Hershiser allowed a one-out walk and single in the bottom of the inning before Jeff Conine's RBI single made it 6–2 Marlins. Jeff Juden relieved Hershiser and after a force-out at second, threw a ball four wild pitch that let Bobby Bonilla score from third. Jim Thome's home run cut the lead to 7–3 in the sixth, then the Indians got another run in the eighth off Jay Powell when Marquis Grissom walked with two outs and scored on Brian Giles's double, but Florida closer Robb Nen came in the ninth and got out of a jam by striking out Sandy Alomar Jr. and Thome with two men aboard.

Game 2

Game 2 matched up Florida ace Kevin Brown against Chad Ogea, who had lost two games in the ALCS. Both teams scored in the first, thanks to RBI singles by David Justice for the Indians after Omar Vizquel doubled with one out and Jeff Conine for the Marlins with two on. Ogea barely escaped further damage when Moisés Alou got under a hanging curveball, but merely flied out to the warning track, missing his second three-run homer in as many nights by inches. After that, Ogea settled in and did not allow any more runs in  innings. Brown pitched well until the fifth when the Indians took the lead by stringing together three singles by Matt Williams, Sandy Alomar Jr., and Marquis Grissom. Later in the inning, with runners on second and third, Bip Roberts drove in a pair of runs with a single up the middle giving the Tribe a 4–1 lead. The three-run lead ballooned to five when Alomar hit a laser into the left field stands for a two-run home run in the sixth. The Indians' 6–1 win tied the series heading to Cleveland.

Game 3

Game 3 was a wild affair that ended with the Marlins grabbing a 2–1 series lead. Charles Nagy of the Indians faced Al Leiter of the Marlins. Both pitchers fared poorly, with Leiter giving up seven runs (four earned) in  innings and Nagy gave up five in six innings. In the top of the first, Gary Sheffield started the scoring with a home run to left. In the bottom half, the Indians retaliated with two runs thanks to two broken bat RBI singles by Matt Williams and Sandy Alomar Jr. Nagy's bases loaded walk to Sheffield tied the game in the third, before Florida took a 3–2 lead in the fourth on Darren Daulton's home run. However, the Indians got a gift in the bottom of the fourth, when they drew four free passes, then a throwing error by third baseman Bobby Bonilla on Manny Ramírez's single allowed two more runs to score. The Tribe went up 7–3 on Jim Thome's two-run home run to right in the fifth inning, which also knocked Leiter out of the game. His home run was nullified in the sixth by Jim Eisenreich's two-run home run that cut the lead to 7–5. In the seventh, Craig Counsell hit a leadoff single off Brian Anderson and moved to second on a groundout, then Édgar Rentería's single and Gary Sheffield's double off Mike Jackson (who was charged with a blown save) each drove in a run, making the score 7–7. In the ninth, Bonilla drew a leadoff walk off reliever Eric Plunk and scored on Daulton's single aided by an error that let Daulton go to third. After a strikeout to Alou (his third of the night) and intentional walk to pinch-hitter Cliff Floyd, an error by first baseman Thome on Plunk's pickoff attempt allowed Daulton to score. After Charles Johnson singled, Alvin Morman relieved Plunk and an error by second baseman Tony Fernández on Counsell's ground ball allowed Floyd to score. After Morman retired Devon White, a walk to Rentería loaded the bases before José Mesa relieved Morman and allowed two-run singles to Sheffield and Bonilla aided by a wild pitch that gave the Marlins at 14–7 lead. In the bottom of the inning, the Indians loaded the bases on a walk and two singles with one out off Robb Nen before Tony Fernández's sacrifice fly and Marquis Grissom's single scored a run each, then Bip Roberts' two-run double cut the lead to 14–11, but Omar Vizquel grounded out to end the game. Dennis Cook got the win in relief by tossing a scoreless eighth and Plunk got the loss. This was the highest scoring game for 20 years until the fifth game of the 2017 World Series between the Houston Astros and the Los Angeles Dodgers; it was also the fourth time a team had scored seven runs in the ninth inning of a postseason game and the first since the 1990 ALCS. Marlins batter Gary Sheffield had five RBIs in the game to lead all batters.

Game 4

This back-and-forth World Series continued that way in Game 4. Both teams were greeted by snow during batting practice and freezing temperatures throughout this contest. The official gametime temperature of 35 °F (3.3 °C) remains  the coldest recorded in World Series history. As the game progressed, media outlets reported wind chill readings as low as 18 °F (−7.8 °C). Two rookies opposed each other on the mound, Jaret Wright for the Indians and Tony Saunders for the Marlins. In the bottom of the first, Omar Vizquel singled with one out before Manny Ramírez's two-run home run put the Indians up 2–0. Matt Williams then singled with two outs and scored on Sandy Alomar's double. In the third, Ramírez drew a leadoff walk, moved to second on an error and scored on David Justice's single. After another walk, Alomar's single scored Justice. After a third walk loaded the bases, Antonio Alfonseca relived Saunders and allowed an RBI single to Tony Fernández. The Marlins got on the board in the fourth on Jim Eisenreich's RBI single with two on, then Moisés Alou's two-run home run after a walk in the sixth cut the Indians' lead to 6–3, but that was as close as the Marlins got. In the bottom of the inning, Alomar's bases-loaded groundout off Ed Vosberg made it 7–3 Indians. Next inning, Fernández hit a leadoff single, moved to second on a ground out and scored on Brian Giles's single. In the eighth, Williams' two-run home run after a walk capped the game's scoring at 10–3 as the Indians tied the series at two games apiece which guaranteed a return to Florida. Wright allowed three runs in six sharp innings and Brian Anderson wrapped up Wright's win with a three-inning save.

Game 5

Game 5 was a rematch of Game 1's starting pitchers Liván Hernández and Orel Hershiser. The Marlins struck first when Darren Daulton hit a ground-rule double and scored on Charles Johnson's single. After a walk to Craig Counsell, Devon White's RBI double made it 2–0 Marlins. The Indians cut it to 2–1 in the bottom of the inning when Jim Thome tripled and scored on Sandy Alomar's single. Next inning, Alomar launched a towering three-run home run after two walks to Thome and Matt Williams to put the Indians up 4–2. In the sixth, Moisés Alou hit his second three-run home run off Hershiser in as many games and his third home run of the Series to put the Marlins up 5–4. Eric Plunk then walked Craig Counsell with the bases loaded to force in Jeff Conine, with the run charged to Hershiser. The Marlins added to their lead in the seventh when Alou hit a leadoff single off Jeff Juden, stole second, moved to third on a groundout, and scored on Johnson's single. Next inning, Alou's single scored pinch-runner Alex Arias (running for Bonilla) with two on off José Mesa extended the lead to 8–4. Livan pitched terrifically in the middle innings, not allowing any runs until the ninth. An error and single put two on with no outs for the Indians. Robb Nen in relief allowed a two-run single to David Justice (both of the runs charged to Hernández), then a two-out RBI single to Thome before Alomar flew out to right to end the game and give the Marlins a 3–2 series lead heading back to Florida.

Game 6

Game 6's attendance of 67,498 was the highest single-game attendance for the World Series since Game 5 of the 1959 World Series, when 92,706 people filled the football-oriented Los Angeles Memorial Coliseum. The Series returned to the warmer climate of Miami for Game 6. Kevin Brown opposed Chad Ogea again and again Brown inexplicably struggled while Ogea flourished. Chad himself drove in the first two runs with a bases-loaded single in the second, and  Manny Ramírez hit a sacrifice fly in the third (after Omar Vizquel hit a leadoff double and stole third) and the fifth (after a leadoff double and subsequent single). Darren Daulton's sacrifice fly with two on in the fifth that scored Moisés Alou from third gave the Marlins their only run of the game. With the Tribe leading 4–1 in the sixth, Ogea ran into serious trouble. The Marlins put runners on second and third with two out as reliever Mike Jackson replaced Ogea. Marlins catcher Charles Johnson stepped to the plate and proceeded to hit a sharp grounder that was headed for left field and looked like a base hit. Indians shortstop Omar Vizquel, who won the Gold Glove that year, dove for the ball, grabbed it, sprung to his feet, and hurled a perfect strike to first base just before Johnson arrived. The play ended the threat and broke the Marlins' spirits. In the ninth, closer José Mesa wrapped up the win despite allowing a triple to Devon White to tie the Series at 3–3.

Game 7

For the decisive final matchup of the World Series, the first time since 1991 that a Game 7 would be played, the Marlins sent Al Leiter to the mound to start. Leiter had been the starter for the Marlins in the high-scoring Game 3 in Cleveland, where he gave up a total of seven runs and did not make it out of the fifth inning, but was spared a potential loss when the Marlins rallied to win. The potential existed for a Game 3 rematch of Leiter and Indians ace Charles Nagy. Nagy managed to pitch six innings and gave up five runs, all earned, in his outing. Like Leiter, he was left with a no-decision after the Cleveland bullpen allowed Florida to tie the game and later win. However, Indians manager Mike Hargrove had another option at his disposal. Rookie Jaret Wright, who was 3-0 in the postseason to this point and had started and won Game 4, was available on three days’ rest and 
Hargrove, who was celebrating his 48th birthday on the night, decided to take the risk and start the rookie on short rest.

The Marlins managed one hit in the 1st inning, a double off the bat of Édgar Rentería. That was the only hit Wright gave up through six innings, and the Indians staked him to a 2–0 lead in the third. With nobody out, Jim Thome walked and Marquis Grissom singled him to second. Pitcher Jaret Wright sacrificed both men into scoring position. After Leiter retired Omar Vizquel for the second out, Tony Fernández singled to drive both runners in for the only runs of the game to that point.

Leiter was removed after six innings and only surrendering the two runs. Leading off the bottom of the seventh for the Marlins, Bobby Bonilla hit Wright's first pitch over the right-center field wall for a home run to cut the lead to 2–1. After striking out Charles Johnson and walking Craig Counsell, Wright was removed from the game in favor of Paul Assenmacher who was scheduled to pitch to Cliff Floyd. Marlins manager Jim Leyland elected to send Kurt Abbott to the plate after the pitching change; Assenmacher retired him on a fly ball, then got Devon White swinging to end the inning.

In the top of the ninth inning, Cleveland again threatened. After Antonio Alfonseca walked Matt Williams to lead off the inning and Sandy Alomar Jr. reached on a fielder's choice to take Williams off the bases, Félix Heredia gave up a single to Thome which advanced Alomar to third. He was then pulled in favor of closer Robb Nen. Nen induced a groundball from Grissom to Rentería at shortstop, who elected to throw Alomar out at home, thanks in part to a great pick and tag by Johnson. He then got Brian Giles to fly out to end the inning.

The Indians sent closer José Mesa to the mound to try to win the series in the bottom of the ninth inning. Moisés Alou led off with a single, and Bonilla struck out swinging on a 3–2 pitch. Four strikes away from losing the World Series, Johnson lined a 1–2 fastball into right field, moving Alou to third. With runners on 1st and 3rd and one out, Craig Counsell fought off a low, inside fastball from Mesa, lining it into deep right field. Manny Ramírez caught the ball on the warning track for the second out, but Alou easily scored from third on the sacrifice fly to tie the game. Although Mesa retired Jim Eisenreich to send the game to extra innings, his blown save would open him to criticism for years to come.

Nen struck out the side in the top of the 10th inning. In the bottom of the frame, Mesa gave up back-to-back one-out singles, and after striking out John Cangelosi looking on a 3-2 pitch, was replaced by Game 3 starter  Nagy, who got Alou to fly out to end the threat. After walking Williams, leading off the top of the 11th inning, Jay Powell retired Cleveland in order thanks to an alert fielder's choice on a sacrifice bunt by Alomar, which Powell fielded and threw out the lead runner at 2nd, followed by a Jim Thome inning-ending double play.

Nagy took to the mound to face Florida in the bottom half of the 11th inning and gave up a single to Bonilla. Gregg Zaun followed by attempting a sacrifice bunt, but he popped out and Bonilla barely made it back to first base. Counsell followed with a slow ground ball to the second base side. Bonilla stopped running for a moment, so as not to touch the ball and be called out for interference. Fernandez, playing behind the baserunner, misplayed the ball and it went into right field. Bonilla rounded second and headed for third.

With runners now on the corners and one out, Nagy put Eisenreich on base with an intentional walk to set up a potential inning ending double play with White coming to bat. On the first pitch of the at-bat, White hit a ground ball to second. Fernandez threw to the plate to force out Bonilla and give the Marlins their second out. The next batter was Rentería, who took the first pitch for a strike.

On Nagy’s next pitch, Rentería hit a hard line drive back up the middle of the infield. The ball hit off Nagy’s glove and rolled into center field, scoring Counsell and winning the game and the series for the Marlins. As Counsell crossed home plate, he leaped into the air raising his arms triumphantly.

After Game 7, the trophy presentation, usually taking place in the winning team's locker room regardless of venue, took place on the field for the first time ever before the crowd of 67,204. It was presided over by then-Chairman of the Executive Committee Bud Selig, who first did the honors in 1995 and would officially become Commissioner of Baseball in 1998. This is now a standard procedure whenever the champions are the home team of the deciding game (the only exception being 1999, when the New York Yankees chose to celebrate in their locker room).

It was the first time since  that the two teams alternated wins throughout the World Series.

In only their fifth season of existence, the Marlins were the quickest expansion team to reach (and win) the World Series until , when the Arizona Diamondbacks did it in their fourth year. Coincidentally, both World Series ended with a game-winning RBI single with Craig Counsell being on the basepath for each.

Composite box
1997 World Series (4–3): Florida Marlins (N.L.) beat Cleveland Indians (A.L.)

Aftermath
Liván Hernández was named the Most Valuable Player of the 1997 World Series. Chad Ogea became the first pitcher since Mickey Lolich in 1968 to have at least two hits and two RBIs in a World Series. The Marlins won despite not having Alex Fernandez, their number-two starter, who did not pitch due to a rotator cuff injury.

On October 31, 1997, most of the key contributors of the 1997 Marlins were traded, including Moisés Alou, who was sent to the Houston Astros, and Al Leiter to the New York Mets, in a fire sale so infamous that it has come to synonymize the term in the baseball world. The Marlins also lost Jeff Conine to the Kansas City Royals in free agency and Darren Daulton who retired.  World Series MVP hurler Liván Hernández, however, stayed with the team for two more years.  The Marlins finished 54–108 in 1998, the worst performance ever by a defending World Series champion. As a result, these Marlins are mockingly referred to as the first "Rent-A-Team" to win the World Series. Midway through the 1998 season, the Marlins would trade Jim Eisenreich, Bobby Bonilla, Gary Sheffield, and Charles Johnson to the Los Angeles Dodgers for Todd Zeile and Mike Piazza. Piazza would be traded shortly after to the Mets in return for prospects, one of which was Preston Wilson.

Jim Leyland, responding to reports that he would retire if the Marlins won the World Series, told NBC during the celebration, "My wife doesn't like me that much. I can't retire."  However, he resigned in the wake of their awful performance in 1998.  He managed the Colorado Rockies in 1999, then scouted for several years before joining the Detroit Tigers as manager in 2006 and taking them to a World Series runner-up finish in his first season.

Marlins owner H. Wayne Huizenga, who dodged questions about selling the team during the on-field celebration, ultimately sold the team to John W. Henry after the 1998 season.  Henry in turn sold it to former Montreal Expos owner Jeffrey Loria in 2001 as part of a deal to purchase the Boston Red Sox.  Loria would return the team to a World Series victory in 2003. That season started with only one of the 1997 World Series players left on the roster: pitcher Rick Helling. Helling was traded mid-season to the Texas Rangers. However, the team traded with the Baltimore Orioles for Jeff Conine. Conine would be the only 1997 Marlin to participate in the 2003 World Series victory.  The 1997 and 2003 seasons marked the Marlins' only trips to the postseason until 2020, when the Marlins lost the NLDS to the Atlanta Braves.

The failure of José Mesa to save Game 7 ultimately ignited a heated feud with teammate Omar Vizquel. In Vizquel's autobiography, the veteran shortstop called Mesa a "choker." The two men ended their longtime friendship. Mesa later vowed to "...hit him every time" he faced him, and also stated that he wanted to kill Vizquel. Though Mesa did not actually bean Vizquel every time he subsequently faced him, he did hit him with pitches at least twice.

The Indians would go on to win the AL Central three of the following four years, however would not return to the World Series during this time. The core of the 1990s Indians teams would break up in the early 2000s, most notably with Manny Ramirez joining the Boston Red Sox in 2001 and Jim Thome joining the Philadelphia Phillies in 2003. The 1997 Indians failed to end the Cleveland sports curse, which stood at 33 years since the 1964 Cleveland Browns won the city's most recent championship. The Curse would eventually end in 2016, when the Cleveland Cavaliers won the NBA Title, giving the city its first major sports title in 52 years.

The total attendance of 403,627 fans is the second-largest in World Series history.  The high attendance is due to the fact that the series went the full seven games and the large seating capacity at Pro Player Stadium.  All four games played in Miami had over 67,000 in attendance.  This Series only trails the 1959 World Series, which drew 420,784 spectators.  That Series had three of its six games played at the Los Angeles Memorial Coliseum and drew over 92,000 for each game played at the Coliseum.

Radio and television coverage
This marked the first time since  that NBC televised a World Series in its entirety. In , NBC televised Games 2, 3, and 6, while rival ABC televised Games 1, 4, and 5, having split that series since ABC was promised the strike-cancelled 1994 World Series. Both networks had announced prior to the 1995 season, that they were bailing out what was initially a six-year-long revenue sharing joint venture with Major League Baseball called "The Baseball Network". Starting with the 1996 World Series, Fox and NBC would alternate World Series broadcast rights for the next five seasons, with NBC broadcasting in odd-numbered years and Fox in even-numbered years.

NBC's West Coast president Don Ohlmeyer disturbed Major League Baseball when he publicly wished the World Series to end in a four-game sweep so that it wouldn't derail NBC's fall entertainment schedule. (Game 5 fell on a Thursday, which had long been the highest rated night on NBC's schedule, if not on all of television.)

Midway through Game 2, "surprise guest" Joe DiMaggio joined NBC's Bob Costas, Joe Morgan and Bob Uecker in the television booth. DiMaggio joked that Morgan was a "Hall of Famer" and Costas a "future Hall of Famer", but he didn't know what to think of when it came to Uecker. The Baseball Hall of Fame would present Uecker with its Ford C. Frick Award several years later. Game 7 turned out to be Bob Uecker's final broadcast for NBC. In 1998, prior to NBC's next scheduled baseball telecast, which would've been the All-Star Game in Denver, Uecker underwent a back operation in which four discs were replaced. Consequently, for the remainder of NBC's contract with Major League Baseball (which as previously mentioned, ran through the 2000 season), Bob Costas and Joe Morgan called the games as a duo.

Also working for NBC's coverage was Jim Gray, who served as field reporter based in the Florida dugout. Meanwhile, Hannah Storm and Keith Olbermann served as hosts of pre-game coverage on NBC, and the first World Series post-game show presented only on cable, on CNBC. Olbermann also served as field reporter in the Cleveland dugout for all games. Storm along with Jim Gray covered the celebration on the field following Game 7. Also following Game 7, Olbermann interviewed Indians manager Mike Hargrove from Cleveland's clubhouse.

This was the last World Series broadcast on CBS Radio, which had covered the World Series consecutively since . ESPN Radio would take over the national radio contract for Major League Baseball the following year. Vin Scully and Jeff Torborg were CBS Radio's announcers for the Series (the latter had once managed the Indians and would later manage the Marlins). This was Scully's eleventh and final World Series call for CBS Radio, and seventh consecutive since he rejoined the network following NBC's 1989 loss of baseball. It was also Scully's 25th and final World Series broadcast overall, including fourteen others he called for NBC and the Los Angeles Dodgers. Torborg would continue to call games for Fox television until the end of the 2000 season, working alongside John Rooney and Chip Caray, when he elected to return to managing and was hired by the Montreal Expos.

Game 7 was the final Major League Baseball game called by longtime Indians Radio Network announcer Herb Score, as he retired at season's end. Score's broadcast partner, Tom Hamilton, would take over as lead announcer and he remains in that position as of the 2021 season. It also marked the final game carried by Indians flagship station WKNR (1220); the broadcast rights would be moved to WTAM for the 1998 season.

See also
Cleveland sports curse
Curse of Rocky Colavito
1997 Japan Series

References

External links

 1997 Florida Marlins
 1997 Cleveland Indians
 Did the 1989 film Back to the Future II predict that the Florida Marlins would win the 1997 World Series?

World Series
World Series
Florida Marlins postseason
Cleveland Indians postseason
World Series
World Series
1990s in Cleveland
October 1997 sports events in the United States
Baseball competitions in Cleveland
1990s in Miami
Baseball competitions in Miami